Emerald Spring is a hot spring located in Norris Geyser Basin of Yellowstone National Park.

History

Originally named Emerald Geyser by Philetus Norris, park superintendent (1877–1882) because of its color, the name was later officially changed to Emerald Spring by the U.S. Geological Survey in 1930.

In 1892 Robert W. Wood, an American optical physicist, used the spring for a prank. He stealthy dissolved a pint of fluorescein in the pool to surprise several witnesses with unusually colorful water.

Characteristics
The spring gets its name from the emerald green color of the water created by sunlight filtering through the water, giving the light a blue color, and reflecting off the yellow sulphur creating the green hue.

While Emerald Spring is a mostly calm pool, which usually only has a few bubbles rising to the surface, it does experience periods of turbidity and small 3-foot (1-m) high eruptions. In 1931, Emerald experienced a period of extremely vigorous activity with eruptions measuring 60 to 75 feet (18.2–22.9 m) in height.

References

External links
 

Geothermal features of Yellowstone National Park
Geothermal features of Park County, Wyoming
Hot springs of Wyoming
Bodies of water of Park County, Wyoming